The 1998 Woking Council election took place on 7 May 1998 to elect members of Woking Borough Council in Surrey, England. One third of the council was up for election and the Liberal Democrats lost overall control of the council to no overall control.

After the election, the composition of the council was
Liberal Democrat 16
Conservative 11
Labour 7
Independent 1

Election result

References

1998
1998 English local elections
1990s in Surrey